Tristan Robert Beck (born June 24, 1996) is an American professional baseball pitcher in the San Francisco Giants organization. He played college baseball for the Stanford Cardinal. The Atlanta Braves selected Beck in the fourth round of the 2018 MLB draft, and traded him to the Giants in 2019.

Amateur career
Beck attended Corona High School in Corona, California, and was on the varsity baseball team for four years. He played for the team as a pitcher and center fielder, and committed to attend Stanford University in order to play college baseball for the Stanford Cardinal. He pitched to a 7–1 win-loss record and a 0.65 earned run average (ERA) with 82 strikeouts and 18 walks in 65 innings pitched as a senior, ending his high school career with a 19–4 record and a 1.23 ERA. Beck also played as the starting quarterback on Corona’s football team during two seasons.

Though eligible for the 2015 MLB draft and projected to be selected in the first round by Baseball America, Beck decided to fulfill his commitment to attend Stanford, and informed teams that he would not sign. The Milwaukee Brewers nevertheless selected him in the 34th round, and he did not sign. He played collegiate summer baseball for the PUF Capitalists of the California Collegiate League, and then enrolled at Stanford. 

As a freshman in 2016, Beck started for the Cardinal on Opening Day, become the third freshman to do so after pitchers Mike Mussina and Cal Quantrill. Beck was named All-Pac-12 Conference, and a Freshman All-American by Collegiate Baseball. Over 14 starts, he went 6–5 with a 2.48 ERA.

Beck suffered a stress fracture in his back in 2017, and missed the entire season. As he was a draft-eligible sophomore, the New York Yankees selected Beck in the 29th round of the 2017 MLB draft. Beck opted to return to Stanford for his junior year. In 2018, Beck went 8–4 with a 2.98 ERA over 15 starts.

Professional career

Atlanta Braves
The Atlanta Braves selected Beck in the fourth round of the 2018 MLB draft. He signed for $900,000, and spent his first professional season with the Gulf Coast League Braves, pitching  scoreless innings. Beck began 2019 with the Florida Fire Frogs, pitching to a 2–2 record with a 5.65 ERA over eight starts, and  innings in which he struck out 39 batters, and then nine innings over two starts for the GCL Braves in which he gave up four earned runs and struck out 14 batters.

San Francisco Giants
On July 31, 2019, the Braves traded Beck and Daniel Winkler to the San Francisco Giants in exchange for relief pitcher Mark Melancon. Beck was assigned to the San Jose Giants, and spent the remainder of the year there, going 3–2 with a 2.27 ERA over six starts, in  innings striking out 37 batters. He was selected to play in the Arizona Fall League for the Scottsdale Scorpions following the 2019 season, and was 1-2 with a 3.63 ERA in  innings in which he struck out 23 batters. Beck did not play professionally in 2020 due to the cancellation of the minor league season as a result of the COVID-19 pandemic. 

He began the 2021 season with the Richmond Flying Squirrels of Double-A Northeast. Playing for Giants Black, San Jose, and Richmond he was 4-5 with a 6.27 ERA in 12 games (10 starts) in which he pitched  innings and struck out 29 batters. 

In 2022, he pitched for Richmond and the Sacramento River Cats of the Triple-A Pacific Coast League. He was a combined 5-9 with a 5.25 ERA as in 23 games (22 starts) he pitched  innings and struck out 116 batters. After the season, the Giants added Beck to their 40-man roster to protect him from being eligible in the Rule 5 draft.

Beck was optioned to Triple-A Sacramento to begin the 2023 season.

Personal life
Beck's mother and older sister are Stanford graduates. His younger brother, Brendan, has played college baseball at Stanford, and currently plays in the New York Yankees organization.

References

External links

1996 births
Living people
Sportspeople from Corona, California
Baseball players from California
Baseball pitchers
Stanford Cardinal baseball players
Gulf Coast Braves players
Florida Fire Frogs players
San Jose Giants players
Scottsdale Scorpions players
Richmond Flying Squirrels players